Michelle Rodgers is an American beauty pageant titleholder from Winchester, Kentucky. She is the winner of the 2009 America's Junior Miss competition.

Biography
A Kentucky native, Rodgers is a 2009 graduate of George Rogers Clark High School in Winchester, Kentucky, a suburb of Lexington. During her senior year, she was named Clark County Junior Miss and in January 2009 won the Kentucky Junior Miss title.

As Kentucky's representative in the America's Junior Miss pageant at the Mobile Civic Center in June 2009, Rodgers sang "Taylor the Latte Boy", a song made famous by Kristin Chenoweth, during the talent competition and advocated for gun control during the interview segment. For being named America's Junior Miss 2009, earned a gold medallion and a $50,000 scholarship. She received an additional $1,000 scholarship as one five recipients of the Joseph "Bobo" Baker interview award.

Rodgers announced she would use the money to attend Northwestern University beginning in fall 2009. There she studied social policy, theater, and business. Rodgers graduated in 2013 and, lives in Eugene, Oregon.

Family
Rodgers' parents are Paul Rodgers, a chemical engineer, and Karen Rodgers, a physical therapist. She has two siblings, a younger sister and a younger brother.

References

Living people
American beauty pageant winners
Northwestern University alumni
People from Winchester, Kentucky
People from Eugene, Oregon
Year of birth missing (living people)
Kentucky beauty pageant winners
21st-century American women